Mind and Cosmos: Why the Materialist Neo-Darwinian Conception of Nature Is Almost Certainly False is a 2012 book by the philosopher Thomas Nagel.

Summary
Nagel argues that the natural and social sciences are unable to account for the existence of mind and consciousness and that the methodologies employed must be revised. He writes that mind is a basic aspect of nature and that any philosophy of nature that cannot account for it is fundamentally misguided. He argues that the standard naturalistic view flies in the face of common sense.

Nagel's position is that principles of an entirely different kind may account for the emergence of life, and in particular conscious life, and that those principles may be teleological, rather than materialist or mechanistic. He stresses that his argument is not a religious one (he is an atheist) and that it is not based on the theory of intelligent design (ID), though he also writes that ID proponents such as Michael Behe, Stephen C. Meyer, and David Berlinski do not deserve the scorn with which their ideas have been met by the overwhelming majority of the scientific establishment.

Reception

Reviews of the book were polarizing, generating significant criticism from numerous scientists and philosophers, including from Steven Pinker, Daniel Dennett, and Elliott Sober. Michael Chorost wrote that Nagel raised valid criticisms but did not sufficiently engage with the large – though not dominant – body of scientific literature related to natural teleology. Chorost also suggests the book would have received less criticism had Nagel not endorsed criticisms raised by proponents of intelligent design, despite Nagel's not having endorsed intelligent design as a solution. 

In an article in New Republic, Leon Wieseltier argued that Nagel was "not denounced for being wrong, but also for being heretical." Philosopher Gary Gutting noted that despite the book's argumentative failings, praised Nagel for developing an "atheism that is anti-materialist" and called it a "refreshing change in our stale battle between science and religion." Physicist Stephen Barr echoed praise for Nagel's boldness, stating that "we ought to be grateful that Nagel has been able to see so much “more of what is so evidently the case” than most contemporary philosophers."

References

Footnotes

Bibliography

External links
 Thomas Nagel, "The Core of ‘Mind and Cosmos’" The Stone August 18, 2013 
 Edward Feser, "Aristotle, Call Your Office" First Things
Elliott Sober, "Remarkable Facts: Ending Science As We Know It" Boston Review
 Wes Alwan, "Evolution is Rigged! A Review of Thomas Nagel’s 'Mind and Cosmos'" The Partially Examined Life 
 Louis B. Jones and P. N. Furbank, "Two Perspectives on Thomas Nagel's Mind and Cosmos The Threepenny Review Fall 2012
 John Dupré, untitled review  Notre Dame Philosophical Reviews
 Brian Leiter and Michael Weisberg, "Do You Only Have a Brain? On Thomas Nagel" The Nation October 3, 2012 
 Adam Frank, "Is There A Place For The Mind In Physics? Part I" NPR
 Alva Noe, "Arguing The Nature Of Values" NPR
 H. Allen Orr, "Awaiting a New Darwin" New York Review of Books Feb 7, 2013
 J. P. Moreland, "A Reluctant Traveler’s Guide for Slouching Towards Theism: A Philosophical Note on Nagel’s Mind and Cosmos" PDF Philosophia Christi Vol. 14, No. 2 2012
 Michael Chorost, "Where Thomas Nagel Went Wrong" The Chronicle of Higher Education May 13, 2013

2012 non-fiction books
Books about evolution
Contemporary philosophical literature
Oxford University Press books
Non-Darwinian evolution
Philosophy books
Philosophy of mind literature
Works by Thomas Nagel